The Pure in Heart is a novel by Susan Hill. It is the second in a series of seven crime novels which contains The Various Haunts of Men and The Risk of Darkness.

References

Novels by Susan Hill
2005 British novels
British crime novels
Chatto & Windus books